is a Japanese animation studio founded in September 2007 and based in Nishitōkyō, Tokyo. Notable works from the studio include JoJo's Bizarre Adventure, Cells at Work!, and Fire Force.

Establishment

The company was founded by former Gonzo president and producer Kōji Kajita and fellow producer Taito Okiura in September 2007 upon having left Gonzo. The company's first work was as an animation subcontractor, but in 2009 David Production undertook their first full animation production as a primary contractor with Ristorante Paradiso.

Fuji TV acquired the studio on August 1, 2014.

The company's name is a reference to the Biblical story of David and Goliath, a story chosen to represent "[the creation of] good animation with great storytelling and characters" despite being smaller than other well-known studios. It is also short for "Design Audio & Visual Illusion Dynamics", which signifies the studio's impactful animations.

Productions

Anime television series

Anime films

Original video animations (OVAs)

Original net animations (ONAs)

See also
 Gonzo—founders Kōji Kajita and Taito Okiura were members of Gonzo prior to the establishment of David Production.
 Shaft—Producers Reo Honjouya and Kousuke Matsunaga, as well as CG director Shinya Takano, were part of Shaft prior to their joining of David Production around 2018.

References

External links 

 

 
Japanese animation studios
Japanese companies established in 2007
Animation studios in Tokyo
Nishitōkyō, Tokyo
Mass media companies established in 2007
Fuji TV
2014 mergers and acquisitions